Hebbecke may refer to:

 Hebbecke, a tributary of the Wupper in North Rhine-Westphalia, Germany
 a district of Schmallenberg, North Rhine-Westphalia, Germany